Frank C. Scherer Wagon Works is a historic factory located in the Fairmount neighborhood of Philadelphia, Pennsylvania.  It was built in 1887, and consists of a three-story, six bay, red brick and sandstone factory building with a two-story, three bay office building.  A one-story addition was built in 1928.  The factory building features segmental arched window openings and a parapet. The office building is of yellow and red brick, with sandstone trim.  The factory became a warehouse in 1923.

It was added to the National Register of Historic Places in 1985.

References

Industrial buildings and structures on the National Register of Historic Places in Philadelphia
Industrial buildings completed in 1887
Fairmount, Philadelphia
Wagons